Alpha Data (formerly, but commonly known as BuzzAngle Music) is a music analytics firm which provides statistics for the music industry, including record sales and music streaming. BuzzAngle partnered with Rolling Stone to provide information for the magazine's music charts.

BuzzAngle was founded in 2013 by Border City Media. It uses big data collected from platforms used by people to listen to music. The website shows total music consumption including album sales, song sales, streaming history, and social media analytics. The data it collects comes from retailers, record stores, radio stations, and music venues. In 2018, BuzzAngle received an investment from Penske Media Corporation, the parent company of Rolling Stone. The following year it announced its partnership with Rolling Stone to provide data for the magazine's music charts.

References

External links
Official Website
Major Movez

Companies established in 2013
Penske Media Corporation